Byron is an extinct town in Clark County, in the U.S. state of Nevada.

History
Byron had about 10 inhabitants at the year 1941, at which time it was a depot on the Union Pacific Railroad. Byron was abandoned by 1949.

References

Ghost towns in Clark County, Nevada